The 1959 West Virginia Mountaineers football team represented West Virginia University as a member of the Southern Conference (SoCon) during the 1959 NCAA University Division football season. Led by Art Lewis in his tenth and final season as head coach, the Mountaineers compiled an overall record of 3–7 with a mark of 2–2 in conference play, placing sixth in the SoCon.

Schedule

References

West Virginia
West Virginia Mountaineers football seasons
West Virginia Mountaineers football